Brightfield may refer to:
Bright-field microscopy
Solar array built on brownfield, e.g. 
 Brockton Brightfield